Leon Dai (born 27 July 1966) is a Taiwanese actor and film director. His film Cannot Live Without You was Taiwan's submission to the 82nd Academy Awards for Best Foreign Language Film.
The film also won two awards at the 46th Golden Horse Film Awards.

In 2016, Dai faced public anger in China over remarks perceived as supportive of the Taiwan independence movement, although he denied any such sympathies. Subsequently, his scenes were dropped from the film No Other Love.

Selected filmography

Awards and nominations

References

External links

 
 Leon Dai at Chinesemov.com

1966 births
Living people
Taiwanese film directors
Taiwanese male film actors
Taiwanese male television actors
21st-century Taiwanese male actors